Penthea vermicularia is a species of beetle in the family Cerambycidae. It was described by Edward Donovan in 1805. It is known from Australia. It feeds on Acacia decurrens.

References

Pteropliini
Beetles described in 1805